Swinfen and Packington  is a civil parish in the district of Lichfield, Staffordshire, England.  It contains twelve buildings that are recorded in the National Heritage List for England.  Of these, one is listed at Grade II*, the middle of the three grades, and the others are at Grade II, the lowest grade.  The parish contains the hamlet of Swinfen and the surrounding countryside.  The listed buildings consist of three country houses and associated structures, farmhouses, and farm buildings.


Key

Buildings

References

Citations

Sources

Lists of listed buildings in Staffordshire